Rajendra Reang is an Indian politician and member of the Communist Party of India (Marxist). He was a former member of Tripura Legislative Assembly from 2003 to 2018 from Kanchanpur Vidhan Sabha Constituency. In 2018 Tripura Legislative Assembly election Rajendra defeated by IPFT candidate Prem Kumar Reang in the margin of 4131 votes.

Political career 
In the year 1974, he joins to Students' Federation of India and involved himself as an activist in the students' movement. Later he joins Tribal Youth Federation in 1995. At present day he is a central committee member of Ganamukti Parishad.

References 

1962 births
Tripuri people
Living people
Communist Party of India (Marxist) politicians
Tripura politicians
Communist Party of India (Marxist) politicians from Tripura
People from Tripura